James Edward Doyle (July 6, 1915 – April 1, 1987) was a United States district judge of the United States District Court for the Western District of Wisconsin and a leader of the Wisconsin Democratic Party.

Education and career

Born in Oshkosh, Wisconsin, Doyle received an Artium Baccalaureus degree from the University of Wisconsin–Madison in 1937 where he had been active in campus politics and was president of the Daily Cardinal Board of Control as well as senior class president. He received a Bachelor of Laws from Columbia Law School in 1940. He was an attorney working in the Criminal Division, United States Department of Justice in Washington, D.C. from 1940 to 1941. He was a law clerk for Justice James F. Byrnes of the United States Supreme Court from 1941 to 1942. He was a United States Naval Reserve lieutenant from 1942 to 1945. He was a consultant for the United States Office of War Mobilization and Reconversion, Washington, D.C. in 1945. He was an assistant to the counselor at the United States Department of State in Washington, D.C. from 1945 to 1946. He was an Assistant United States Attorney of Western District of Wisconsin from 1946 to 1948. He was in private practice of law in Madison, Wisconsin from 1948 to 1965. He was an early organizer of the Wisconsin Democratic Party and chairman of the state party from 1951 to 1953. He was executive director of the 1960 National Stevenson for President Committee formed to draft Adlai Stevenson as the Democratic nominee in the 1960 Presidential election.

Federal judicial service

Doyle was nominated by President Lyndon B. Johnson on April 29, 1965, to a seat on the United States District Court for the Western District of Wisconsin vacated by Judge David Rabinovitz. He was confirmed by the United States Senate on May 21, 1965, and received his commission on May 22, 1965. He served as Chief Judge from 1978 to 1980. He assumed senior status on July 7, 1980. Doyle's service was terminated on April 1, 1987, due to his death from cancer at his Madison home.

Personal life

Doyle was married to Ruth Bachhuber Doyle, who served in the Wisconsin State Assembly. They had four children: Mary E. Doyle; Jim Doyle, the former Governor of Wisconsin; Catherine M. Doyle; and Anne Doyle.

References

Sources
 James Doyle Oral History, Wisconsin Historical Society
 

1915 births
1987 deaths
Columbia Law School alumni
Democratic Party of Wisconsin chairs
Judges of the United States District Court for the Western District of Wisconsin
Lawyers from Madison, Wisconsin
People from Oshkosh, Wisconsin
United States district court judges appointed by Lyndon B. Johnson
20th-century American judges
University of Wisconsin–Madison alumni
United States Navy officers
20th-century American lawyers
Military personnel from Wisconsin
Assistant United States Attorneys
United States Navy personnel of World War II